Loudoun County High School is a public secondary school in Leesburg, Virginia. It is part of Loudoun County Public Schools. It currently serves students without individualized needs Leesburg.

History
The school opened in 1954, which makes it the oldest operating high school in Loudoun County.

Mascot
The previous mascot for the school, the Raider, was named after the Mosby's Raiders. The mascot was chosen by a segregated student body in 1954. The original school seal depicted the Raider on horseback with a Confederate Battleflag in his hands. This logo was changed in 1980 to the current design in response to criticism over the emblem.

Previous attempts to remove the mascot were made in the 1970s and 1990s. Amid the George Floyd protests in 2020, alumni started a petition to change the mascot. On June 30, 2020, the Loudoun County School Board officially removed the mascot. The new mascot, the Captains, was adopted on September 2, 2020.

Murals
In 1957 murals that illustrate important events and times in Loudoun County's history were painted in the Auditorium by the Loudoun Sketch Club. Two subsequent murals were created, one in the 1970s, the other in 2004 (commemorating the school's fiftieth year in operation).

Renovations
County has undergone several renovations and expansions since it was opened. The first expansion occurred in 1966, with the addition of a Vocational Education Wing attached to the side of the front portion of the building (Vocational Education has since moved to C.S. Monroe Technology Center).

In 2002, two high school seniors set an assistant principal's office on fire, closing school for a week. Because of the fire's damage, the school had to replace its old-fashioned bell system with an electronic one that the other five high schools at that time used. The main office was renovated before the end of the 2001–2002 school year.

Segregation
County originally opened up as a segregated school for whites. Black students went to Douglass High School. In the 1968–1969 school year, County became fully integrated.

NJROTC
The NJROTC Program at Loudoun County High began in the 2009–2010 school year. The program draws from the entire county. The program is the first JROTC in Loudoun County, and is currently the newest program in the nation.

Accreditation and test scores

Accreditation
Loudoun County High School is a fully accredited high school based on its overall performance on the Standards of Learning tests in Virginia. In 1958, The school was evaluated and accredited by the Southern Association of Colleges and Schools.

SAT Scores
The average SAT score in 2006 for Loudoun County was a 1,582 (530 in Math; 537 in Critical Reading; 515 in Writing).

Athletics
The Loudoun County Girl's volleyball team has won every state championship since 2007.

Athletic facilities
The Captains have a stadium which features a 400m track and a multipurpose AstroTurf field. Beside the stadium is a practice field on grass which has field goal posts and soccer nets. Other outside facilities include 6 tennis courts, a baseball field, a softball field and a marching band practice field. Inside is a weight room and a wrestling/gymnastics facility.

State championships

Band 
The Loudoun County Captain Band, formerly Loudoun County Raider Band, has been a Virginia honor band every year since 2004. The marching band also won the 4A US BANDS National Championship in 2018  and 5A US BANDS National Championships with the highest score of all time in the A class division.

References

Educational institutions established in 1954
Public high schools in Virginia
Northern Virginia Scholastic Hockey League teams
Schools in Loudoun County, Virginia
1954 establishments in Virginia
Leesburg, Virginia